The golden point, a sudden death overtime system, is used to resolve drawn rugby league matches in the National Rugby League, Australasia's top competition in the sport. The term is borrowed from the golden goal system formerly employed in association football (soccer). The golden point is used to determine a winner when scores are level at the end of regular time. Prior to its introduction into the National Rugby League competition at the beginning of the 2003 season, normal season games were left as draws; in finals matches, 20 minutes extra time ensued (10 minutes each way), with a replay in the event of a draw. If the scores are level at the end of 80 minutes, five minutes are played, the teams swap ends with no break, and a further five minutes are played. Any score (try, penalty goal, or field goal) in this 10-minute period secures a win for the scoring team, and the game ends at that point. If the scoring event is a try, no conversion is attempted. If no further scoring occurs, the game is drawn and each team receives one competition point. 

As of 10 September 2022, 144 golden point games have been played, with 14 remaining a draw after the ten minutes of golden point extra-time. Daly Cherry-Evans has scored the winning points on six occasions, more than anyone in the NRL, with Johnathan Thurston and Valentine Holmes behind him on four. The Cronulla-Sutherland Sharks have played the most golden point games with 22 in total, while Canterbury have played the least with 13. The Canterbury-Bankstown Bulldogs are the most successful team under the format, having won nine of their 13 golden point matches (including a draw), whilst the Wests Tigers are the worst, having lost 15 of their 20 matches. The St. George Illawarra Dragons were the final club to win their first golden point match, after five previous failed attempts. The South Sydney Rabbitohs, New Zealand Warriors and Brisbane Broncos have all featured in the most drawn matches with four.

Only one match up has occurred on four occasions, the Rabbitohs v the Tigers, with Souths winning all four. Match ups which have occurred on three occasions are: The North Queensland Cowboys vs. the Penrith Panthers, the Sydney Roosters vs. the New Zealand Warriors, the Manly Warringah Sea Eagles vs. the Canterbury-Bankstown Bulldogs, the Brisbane Broncos vs. the North Queensland Cowboys, the Melbourne Storm vs. the Manly Warringah Sea Eagles, and the Melbourne Storm vs. the Sydney Roosters. The Panthers have a 2–1 record over the Cowboys, Souths have a 4–0 record over the Tigers, the Warriors have a 2–0–1 record over the Roosters, the Bulldogs have a 3–0 record over Manly, the Cowboys have a 2–1 record over the Broncos, the Storm share a 1-1-1 record against Manly, and the Roosters have a 2–1 record over Melbourne.

The first golden point game in a grand final occurred in 2015, between the Brisbane Broncos and the North Queensland Cowboys, which was won 17–16 by the Cowboys after a Johnathan Thurston field goal sealed the win and a first premiership title for the Cowboys. 

Following the 2015 NRL Grand Final the rules for tied NRL finals matches reverted to two five minute periods of extra-time, followed by golden point extra time if required.

The first golden point game in a NRL Women's Premiership match occurred during the fifth season of the competition in 2022, with Rachael Pearson of the St. George Illawarra Dragons scoring a field goal to defeat the Brisbane Broncos 19–18.

List of golden point matches

Tally

List of NRLW golden point games

Footnotes

References

Golden point games